The Mark-8 is a microcomputer design from 1974, based on the Intel 8008 CPU (which was the world's first 8-bit microprocessor). The Mark-8 was designed by Jonathan Titus, a Virginia Tech graduate student in Chemistry. After building the machine, Titus decided to share its design with the community and reached out to Radio-Electronics and Popular Electronics. He was turned down by Popular Electronics, but Radio-Electronics was interested and announced the Mark-8 as a 'loose kit' in the July 1974 issue of Radio-Electronics magazine.

Project kit 

The Mark-8 was introduced as a 'build it yourself' project in Radio-Electronics'''s July 1974 cover article, offering a US$5 booklet containing circuit board layouts and DIY construction project descriptions, with Titus himself arranging for $50 circuit board sets to be made by a New Jersey company for delivery to hobbyists. Prospective Mark-8 builders had to gather the various electronics parts themselves from various sources. A couple of thousand booklets and some one-hundred circuit board sets were eventually sold.

The Mark-8 was introduced in R-E as "Your Personal Minicomputer" as the word 'microcomputer' was still far from being commonly used for microprocessor-based computers. In their announcement of their computer kit, the editors placed the Mark-8 in the same category as the era's other 'minisize' computers.  As quoted by an Intel official publication, "The Mark-8 is known as one of the first computers for the home."

 Influences 
Although not very commercially successful, the Mark-8 prompted the editors of Popular Electronics'' magazine to consider publishing a similar but more easily accessible microcomputer project, and just six months later, in January 1975, they went through with their plans announcing the Altair 8800. According to a 1998 Virginia Tech University article, Titus' Mark-8 microcomputer now resides in the Smithsonian Institution's "Information Age" display

See also
 Microcomputer
 Minicomputer
SCELBI
MCM/70
Micral

References

External links
 Mark-8 Minicomputer – an original Mark-8, restored to working condition
 A Mark-8 Experience – Terry Ritter's detailed memoir of building and running a Mark-8 in 1974.
 Collection of old analog and digital computers at www.oldcomputermuseum.com
 Jonathan A. Titus, Microcomputer Pioneer
 A look at 5 very different MARK-8 computers
 Titus and the Mark-8, Bit-by-Bit, a Haverford College Publication

Early microcomputers
8-bit computers